Braceville Township is one of seventeen townships in Grundy County, Illinois, USA.  As of the 2010 census, its population was 6,467 and it contained 2,510 housing units.

Geography

Cities, towns, villages
 Braceville
 Coal City (south three-quarters)
 Diamond (south quarter)
 Godley (west half)

Unincorporated towns
 Central City at 
 Mazonia at 
(This list is based on USGS data and may include former settlements.)

Extinct towns
 Centerville at 
(These towns are listed as "historical" by the USGS.)

Cemeteries
The township contains Cotton Cemetery.

Major highways
  Interstate 55
  Illinois Route 53

Demographics

School districts
 Coal City Community Unit School District 1

Political districts
 Illinois' 11th congressional district
 State House District 75
 State Senate District 38

References
 
 United States Census Bureau 2007 TIGER/Line Shapefiles
 United States National Atlas

External links
 City-Data.com
 Illinois State Archives

Townships in Grundy County, Illinois
Townships in Illinois
1849 establishments in Illinois